Mental illness denial or mental disorder denial is a form of denialism in which a person denies the existence of mental disorders. Both serious analysts and pseudoscientific movements question the existence of certain disorders. 

In psychiatry, insight is the ability of an individual to understand their mental health condition, and anosognosia is the lack of awareness of a mental health condition. Certain psychological analysts argue this denialism is a coping mechanism usually fueled by narcissistic injury. 

A minority of professional researchers see disorders such as depression from a sociocultural perspective and argue that the solution to it is fixing a dysfunction in the society, not in the person's brain.

Insight
In psychiatry, insight is the ability of an individual to understand their mental health, and anosognosia is the lack of awareness of a mental health condition.  

According to Elyn Saks, probing patient's denial may lead to better ways to help them overcome their denial and provide insight into other issues. Major reasons for denial are narcissistic injury and denialism. In denialism, a person tries to deny psychologically uncomfortable truth and tries to rationalize it. This urge for denialism is fueled further by narcissistic injury. Narcissism gets injured when a person feels vulnerable (or weak or overwhelmed) for some reason like mental illness.

Athletes
Studies show that overtrained athletes can have major depressive disorder but many athletic trainers and psychologists deny this and as a result athletes are not getting proper medical treatment. Patients deny existence of depression and blame themselves for their inadequacies and try to overcome their inadequacies, making the symptoms more severe. Their denial also acts as an obstacle for biopsychological approach towards overtraining.

Scholarly criticism of psychiatric diagnosis 

Scholars have criticized mental health diagnoses as arbitrary.  According to Thomas Szasz, mental illness is a social construct. He views psychiatry as a social control and mechanism for political oppression. Szasz wrote a book on the subject in 1961, The Myth of Mental Illness.

Society

India
Mental illness denial in India is a common problem. Many Indians view mental illnesses as "touchy-feely, new-age hogwash", even though 1 in every 10 Indians have a mental health condition in India.

References

Denialism
Mental disorders